The Savoia-Marchetti S.57 was an Italian single-engine biplane flying boat intended for aerial reconnaissance, built by Savoia-Marchetti for Regia Aeronautica after World War I.

Design and development
Of wooden construction with a single-step hull, with pilot and observer/gunner in tandem open cockpits in the bow, the S.57 was powered by a single  Isotta-Fraschini V.6. The observer had a single ring-mounted  machine gun.

Eighteen S.57s were accepted by Regia Aeronautica in 1925 and used as trainers.

A sole S.57bis (improved) was built, with a  Hispano-Suiza Type 42 engine.

Operators

 Regia Aeronautica

Specifications

See also

References

S.57
1920s Italian military reconnaissance aircraft
Flying boats
Single-engined pusher aircraft
Biplanes
Aircraft first flown in 1923